Liang's Garden (also known as Liang Yuan), is located in Foshan, China, and is one of four famous gardens in Guangdong Province. (The other three famous gardens are: Yuyin Garden, Keyuan and Qinghui Garden.)

Liang's Garden contains residencies, pagodas, sculptures lakes with fine gardens of trees, shrubs and flowers. It includes the Twelve-Stone House(), Qunxing Thatched Cottage, Fenjiang Thatched Cottage and the Hanxiang House, among others.

It is a traditional private garden that belongs to Liang's family. The builders are uncles and nephews of the family: Liang Airu, Liang Jiuzhang, Liang Jiuhua and Liang Jiutu. They built in the Qing empire 1796, carefully built over 40 years. In the early Republic period (about 1912), the garden was nearly destroyed.

In 1982, Foshan government saved and protected Qunxing Thatched Cottage. In 1990, Liang's Garden was given cultural relic protection status by the Guangdong provincial government. In 1994, large-scale total repair began, which covered a land of 21.260 square meter.

References

Gardens in Guangdong
Tourist attractions in Foshan